Kwun Tong Road is a major thoroughfare in Kwun Tong District, New Kowloon, Hong Kong.

Location
Kwun Tong Road starts at the junction with Prince Edward Road East, Clear Water Bay Road and Lung Cheung Road in Ngau Chi Wan. It runs along the coast of Kwun Tong before reclamation, spans south in Ngau Tau Kok and Kwun Tong, and ends at a junction with Tsui Ping Road, where it is succeeded by Lei Yue Mun Road. Kwun Tong Road is a section of Route 7.

Kwun Tong Road runs through the areas around Kwun Tong Bypass, Kai Yip Estate, the ex-premise of St. Joseph's Anglo-Chinese School, Kowloon Bay station, Lower Ngau Tau Kok Estate, Ting Fu Street, Ngau Tau Kok station, Millennium City, apm Millennium City 5 shopping mall, the roundabout with Hip Wo Street and Hoi Yuen Road beneath Kwun Tong station of MTR, and Bus Terminus.

History
When Kwun Tong station was being built in 1979, a road tunnel known as the Kwun Tong Road Underpass was dug beneath the station to give a bypass for traffic. Having traffic on the main route diverted into the tunnel, the roundabout functions efficiently. Nevertheless, as road transport in the region becomes saturated, the roundabout still occasionally has traffic congestions.

Features
Remaining buildings of the former RAF Kai Tak are located along Kwun Tong Road.
With 6 lanes on either side, it is the widest road in urban Hong Kong second widest road in the entire region, only surpassed by Cheung Tsing Highway.
A section of Kwun Tong line is elevated along Kwun Tong Road.

Gallery

References

Kwun Tong
Roads in New Kowloon
Route 7 (Hong Kong)